Lisania is an extinct genus of ptychopariid trilobites, and is the type genus of the family Lisaniidae. It lived during the Cambrian Period, which lasted from approximately 542 to 488 million years ago.

References

Cambrian trilobites of Asia
Ptychopariida genera